Fabrics in this list include fabrics that are woven, braided or knitted from textile fibres.

A
 Aertex
 Alençon lace
 Antique satin
 Argentan lace
 Argentella lace

B

 Bafta cloth
 Baize
 Ballistic nylon
 Barathea
 Barkcloth
 Batik
 Batiste
 Battenberg lace
 Bedford cord
 Bengaline silk
 Beta cloth
 Bobbinet
 Boiled wool
 Bombazine
 Bouclé
 Brilliantine
 Broadcloth
 Brocade
 Broderie Anglaise
 Buckram
 Bunting
 Burano lace
 Buratto lace
 Burlap

C

 C change
 Calico
 Cambric
 Camel's hair
 Camlet
 Canvas
 Capilene
 Carrickmacross lace
 Challis
 Chantilly lace
 Char cloth
 Charmeuse
 Charvet
 Cheesecloth
 Chenille
 Chiengora
 Chiffon
 Chino
 Chintz
 Cloqué
 Cloth of gold
 Coolmax
 Cordura
 Corduroy
 Cotton duck
 Crash (fabric)
 Crepe 
 Crêpe de Chine
 Cretonne
 Crochet

D

 Damask
 Darlexx
 Denim
 Dimity
 Dobby
 Donegal tweed
 Dotted Swiss
 Double cloth
 Dowlas
 Drill
 Drugget
 Duck
 Dupioni silk
 Dungarees
 Dyneema

E
 Eolienne

F
 Faux fur
 Faux leather
 Felt
 Filet/Lacis lace
 Fishnet
 Flannel
 Flannelette
 Foulard
 Fustian

G
 Gabardine
 Gannex
 Gauze
 Gazar
 Georgette
 Ghalamkar
 Gingham
 Gore-Tex
 Grenadine
 Grenfell Cloth
 Grosgrain

H
 Habutai
 Halas lace
 Haircloth
 Harris Tweed
 Hessian
 Herringbone
 Himro
 Hodden
 Holland cloth
 Hollie Point lace
 Houndstooth check

I
 Intarsia
 Interlock Jersey

J
 Jacquard knit
 Jamdani
 Jersey

L
 Lace
 Lamé
 Lampas
 Lantana
 Lanon
 Lawn cloth
 Leather
 Leatherette
 Limerick lace
 Linen
 Linsey-woolsey
 Loden
 Longcloth

M

 Mackinaw
 Madapollam
 Madras
 Matelassé
 Melton
 Mesh
 Milliskin
 Mockado
 Moire
 Moleskin
 Monk's cloth
 Moquette
 Mouflon
 Mousseline
 Muslin

N
 Nankeen
 Neoprene
 Net

O
 Oilskin
 Organdy
 Organza
 Osnaburg
 Ottoman
 Oxford

P

 Paduasoy
 Panné velvet
 Peau de Soie
 Percale
 Piqué
 Pleated linen
 Plissé
 Plush
 Point de France lace
 Point de Gaze lace
 Point de Venise lace
 Polar fleece
 Pongee
 Poplin
 Punto in Aria lace

Q

R
 Rakematiz
 Rayadillo
 Rep
 Reticella lace
 Rib knit
 Rinzu
 Ripstop
 Russell cord

S

 Saga Nishiki
 Sailcloth
 Samite
 Sateen
 Satin
 Saye
 Scarlet
 Scrim
 Seersucker
 Serge
 Shantung
 Sharkskin
 Shot silk
 Silnylon
 Songket
 Stockinette
 Stuff
 Suede
 Surah
 Swanskin cloth
 SympaTex

T
 Taffeta
 Tais
 Tambour lace
 Toile
 Tapestry
 Tartan
 Teneriffe lace
 Terrycloth
 Tricot
 Terry velour
 Tulle netting
 Tweed
 Twill

U
 Ultrasuede

V
 Velour
 Velours du Kasaï
 Velvet
 Velveteen
 Venetian Lace
 Ventile
 Vinyl coated polyester (PVC)
 Viyella
 Voile

W
 Wadmal
 Whipcord
 Wigan
 Worsted wool

Y
 Youghal lace

Z
 Zephyr
 Zibeline
 Zorbeez

See also

 List of textile fibres
 Technical textiles
 Textile
 Textile manufacturing
 History of clothing and textiles

References

Textiles
Clothing industry
fabrics